Ghassan Ibrahim (born in Syria in 1977) is the Editor in Chief of Global Arab Network and a Syrian journalist.

Education
He studied at Damascus University where he completed his BSc in Economics and Postgraduate Degree in Finance.
In 2000, he came to UK to study at the University of London, where he completed Economics, Business and Media courses. In 2006 established Global Arab Network.

Career
He is a Managing Editor of the Arabic Department at Ahval, based in London.
Research Manager and Journalist at Al-Arab Newspaper, the first Arabic media organization in London, established  in 1977.
He works as an adviser for several Arab Businessmen and international organization related to Middle East and North Africa and appears regularly on British, European 
  and Arab TV channels.
He is also a writer about Arab affairs in politics, economics, business and media.

References

External links
  - Twitter ,
  - Ahval , English
  - Facebook , English
  - official webpage, English

1977 births
Living people
Syrian journalists
Damascus University alumni
Syrian democracy activists
People from Damascus
21st-century Syrian politicians
21st-century Syrian economists
People of the Syrian civil war